The Wyndham Championship is a professional golf tournament in North Carolina on the PGA Tour. It is played annually in Greensboro and was originally the Greater Greensboro Open.

History
Founded  in 1938 as the Greater Greensboro Open, it was usually played in April or May, until a schedule change in 2003 moved it toward the end of the season. At the age of 52, Sam Snead set PGA Tour records in 1965 for his eighth win at an event and as the oldest winner of a tournament; both records still stand. He won his 8th title 27 years after his first win in 1938. Davis Love III, the 2015 champion at age 51, is the oldest to win in the senior tour era, which began in 1980. 

Charlie Sifford competed in 1961, and became the first African American permitted to play in a PGA-sponsored event in the South. He led after the first round, and tied for fourth.

In 2007, the event was renamed the Wyndham Championship when Wyndham Hotels & Resorts took over from DaimlerChrysler as title sponsor, and dropped "Greensboro" from the title. It moved from an autumn date to mid-August and is the last PGA Tour event before the FedEx Cup Playoffs, as one last chance to qualify for the FedEx Cup and retain their tour privileges if not already exempt. 

The purse for 2015 was $5.4 million, with a winner's share of $972,000.

On August 16, 2018, during the first round, Brandt Snedeker shot a 59. It was the tenth sub-60 round in the history of the PGA Tour, and just the third with a bogey. Snedeker shot a 27 on the inward nine, burying a twenty foot putt from the fringe to make history.

The 2021 event featured a six-way playoff for first place, which was won by Kevin Kisner. This tied the PGA Tour record for largest number of participants in a sudden-death playoff. This also occurred at the 1994 GTE Byron Nelson Golf Classic and the 2001 Nissan Open.

Courses 
The event has been played in the Greensboro area for its entire history. In its first four years, it was played at both Sedgefield Country Club and Starmount Forest Country Club. During World War II, it shifted solely to Starmount Forest in 1942, and was not held in 1943 and 1944. Starting in 1945, it alternated between Starmount Forest and Sedgefield until 1952, when Starmount Forest hosted for consecutive years.

It returned to Sedgefield in 1953 before Starmount Forest hosted for three consecutive years, (through 1956). Sedgefield hosted in 1957 and Starmount Forest hosted for another three straight years from 1958–60, then back to Sedgefield from 1961 to 1976. It shifted to Forest Oaks Country Club from 1977 to 2007, then returned to Sedgefield in 2008.  The course at Sedgefield was designed by noted architect Donald Ross; it opened  in 1926 and was restored in 2007.

Winners

Note: Green highlight indicates scoring records.
Sources:

Multiple winners
Ten players have won this tournament more than once, through 2020.
8 wins
Sam Snead: 1938, 1946, 1949, 1950, 1955, 1956, 1960, 1965
3 wins
Davis Love III: 1992, 2006, 2015
2 wins
Byron Nelson: 1941, 1945
Doug Sanders: 1963, 1966
Billy Casper: 1962, 1968
George Archer: 1967, 1972
Danny Edwards: 1977, 1982
Sandy Lyle: 1986, 1988
Rocco Mediate: 1993, 2002
Brandt Snedeker: 2007, 2018

References

External links

Coverage on PGA Tour's official site
Sedgefield Country Club

PGA Tour events
Golf in North Carolina
Sports competitions in Greensboro, North Carolina
Wyndham Destinations
Recurring sporting events established in 1938
1938 establishments in North Carolina